Elmalı is a village in the Tercan District, Erzincan Province, Turkey. The village is populated by Kurds of the Balaban tribe and had a population of 16 in 2021.

The hamlets of Çamlık, Gümüşsu and Küçükelmalı are attached to the village.

References 

Villages in Tercan District

Kurdish settlements in Erzincan Province